Argyranthemum frutescens, known as Paris daisy, marguerite or marguerite daisy, is a perennial plant known for its flowers. It is native to the Canary Islands (part of Spain). Hybrids derived from this species (garden marguerites) are widely cultivated as ornamental plants in private gardens and public parks in many countries, and have naturalized in Italy and southern California. There are many cultivars, but the most common has white petals.

Description
The strongly branched plant often grows globose-bushy with ascending to upright branches. The foliage is green.

In most subspecies, the ligules of the ray florets are about 8 mm long, pure white, female and form fertile achenes, which are triangular to horn-like winged. The achenes of the yellow tubular central flowers are sterile and one-winged. The pappus is always irregularly crown-shaped. The flower is very fragrant. The flower opens its petals in the morning and closes them at night.

Subspecies
List:
 Argyranthemum frutescens subsp. canariae (Christ) Humphries 
 Argyranthemum frutescens subsp. foeniculaceum (Pit. & Proust) Humphries
 Argyranthemum frutescens subsp. frutescens
 Argyranthemum frutescens subsp. gracilescens (Christ) Humphries
 Argyranthemum frutescens subsp. pumilum Humphries

Distribution and habitat
Like the other Argyranthemum species, the shrub marguerite originates from the Canary Islands. On El Hierro, La Gomera, Tenerife and Gran Canaria it is common in the coastal regions, on La Palma very rare. Overall, it is the most common species of the genus in the Canary Islands. The plant often grows in succulent shrubbery on well-drained, poor soils in full sun, preferably also near the coast at altitudes up to 700 meters.

Along with full sunlight, this plant needs organic matter in high quantities in order to grow, while it also requires very well drained soil. The plant can die if overwhelmed with water. It is tolerant of low temperatures, although it cannot survive freezing. It requires a lot of sunlight and must be protected from the wind.

Cultivation
Argyranthemum frutescens subsp. canariae has been given the Award of Garden Merit (AGM) by the Royal Horticultural Society. Many of the plants grown under the name "Argyranthemum frutescens" are cultivars of garden marguerites, some being hybrids between this species and related genera. The cultivars produce prolific single or double-flowered daisy-like flowers in shades of white, pink, yellow and purple throughout summer. In the UK climate, they are generally half-hardy, and can be grown from seed or cuttings, or purchased as young plants to be planted out after all danger of frost has passed.

See also
Leucanthemum, similar looking plant of different genus

References

External links
  Plants database United States Department of Agriculture plants profile, Argyranthemum frutescens
 Jepson Manual Online, Argyranthemum frutescens
 Missouri Botanical Garden, Gardening Help, Plant Finder
 Royal Horticultural Society, London
 Easy Bloom, Marguerite daisy, Madeira White Improved (Argyranthemum frutescens)
 Sciencedirect, Antonio G. Gonzalez, Rafael Estevez-Reyes, Ana Estevez-Braun, Angel G. Ravelo, Ignacio A. Jimenez, Isabel L. Bazzocchi, Marcelino A. Aguilara, Laila Moujirb. 1997. Biological activities of some Argyranthemum species. Phytochemistry 45:963–967#
 National flower of Denmark

Glebionidinae
Endemic flora of the Canary Islands
Plants described in 1753
Taxa named by Carl Linnaeus
Garden plants